George Hinckley, VC (22 June 1819 – 31 December 1904) was a sailor in the Royal Navy and a recipient of the Victoria Cross, the highest award for gallantry in the face of the enemy that can be awarded to British and Commonwealth forces.

Details
Hinckley was 43 years old, and an able seaman in the Royal Navy serving in the Naval Brigade during the Taiping Rebellion when the following deed took place for which he was awarded the VC.

On 9 October 1862 in Fenghua, China, Able Seaman Hinckley volunteered to go to the rescue of the assistant master of the Sphinx, who was lying in the open severely wounded. He then returned and carried a wounded army captain to safety.

Hinckley later achieved the rank of quartermaster.

References

External links
Sale of VC
Location of grave and VC medal (Devonshire)

1819 births
1904 deaths
British military personnel of the Taiping Rebellion
British recipients of the Victoria Cross
Royal Navy recipients of the Victoria Cross
Royal Navy sailors
Victoria Cross awardees from Liverpool